Helmut Krausser (11 July 1964) is a German author, poet, playwright, composer and professional chess player who was born in Esslingen.

Biography
Krausser lives in Munich and Berlin. He married Beatrice Renauer in 1991.

In 1993 he received the Toucan Prize.

After a few smaller novels his literary breakthrough arrived with Melodien oder Nachträge zum quecksilbernen Zeitalter. Since then, many of his books have been translated into multiple languages and plays of his have been performed all over the world.

Krausser also composes classical music.

Works

Novels, short stories and poems
 Könige über dem Ozean. Munich: Knaus, 1989
 Spielgeld. Munich: Kirchheim, 1990
 Fette Welt. Munich: List, 1992
 Tagebücher Mai 1992 – April 2004. Munich: Belleville, 1992–2004, each year one month
 Melodien oder Nachträge zum quecksilbernen Zeitalter. Munich: List, 1993
 Die Zerstörung der europäischen Städte. Munich: List, 1994
 Thanatos. Munich: Luchterhand, 1996
 Der große Bagarozy. Reinbek near Hamburg: Rowohlt, 1997
 English: The Great Bagarozy Dedalus, 1998, transl. by Mike Mitchell
 Schweine und Elefanten. Reinbek near Hamburg: Rowohlt, 1999
 Das Kaninchen, das den Jäger erschoss – und andere bizarre Todesfälle. Reinbek near Hamburg: Rowohlt, 1999
 Gedichte 79–99. Munich: Belleville, 1999
 Schmerznovelle. Reinbek near Hamburg: Rowohlt, 2001
 Wenn Gwendolin nachts schlafen ging. Munich: Kunstmann, 2002
 UC (Ultrachronos). Reinbek near Hamburg: Rowohlt, 2003
 Strom, Gedichte 99-03. Reinbek near Hamburg: Rowohlt, 2003
 Die wilden Hunde von Pompeii. Reinbek near Hamburg: Rowohlt, September 2004
 Eros. DuMont 2006
 Plasma. Gedichte. DuMont 2007
 Die kleinen Gärten des Maestro Puccini.  DuMont 2008
 Einsamkeit und Sex und Mitleid.  Dumont, August 2009
 Zwei ungleiche Rivalen – Puccini und Franchetti.  Bertelsmann 2010
 Die letzten schönen Tage. Dumont, Februar 2011

Plays
 Stücke 93-03. Frankfurt am Main: Fischer, 2003, includes:
 Lederfresse
 English: Leatherface Fischer, 1996, transl. by Tony Meech
 Haltestelle Geister
 Denotation Babel

Other
Krausser wrote several contributions and articles in numerous newspapers and magazines. Furthermore, records and radio plays of him were released. Two movies have been made from his novels to date (2004).

References

External links

Review of the English translation of The Great Bagarozy
 bibliography all published works at rowohlt
Lutz Hagestedt: Helmut Krausser
  page also in English. Krausser is very engaged in making the works of the forgotten (and forbidden) Jewish composer Alberto Franchetti popular again.

1964 births
Living people
People from Esslingen am Neckar
20th-century German novelists
21st-century German novelists
German poets
German male poets
German male novelists
German male dramatists and playwrights
20th-century German dramatists and playwrights
21st-century German dramatists and playwrights
German-language poets
20th-century German male writers
21st-century German male writers